U2.COMmunication is a live album recorded by U2 and released exclusively to members of its official website in 2005.  The album features performances from two different concerts from the Vertigo Tour—a concert in Chicago, filmed for the Vertigo 2005: Live from Chicago video, and a concert in Milan filmed for the Vertigo 05: Live from Milan video which was released with deluxe copies of the compilation album, U218 Singles.  The album's title is a play on U2.com, the band's website.

One of the highlights is an emotional performance of "Miss Sarajevo," dedicated to the victims of the July 2005 London bombings. Bono sings Luciano Pavarotti's aria in this performance.

The album also came with a bonus CD-ROM featuring wallpapers, screensavers, and a video performance of "Vertigo" from Milan. On November 20, 2006, the album was discontinued to release Zoo TV Live.

Track listing

Personnel
 Bono – lead vocals, guitar on "The Fly"
 The Edge – guitar, keyboards, vocals
 Adam Clayton – bass guitar, keyboards
 Larry Mullen Jr. – drums, backing vocals on "Elevation" and "Miracle Drug"

See also
 U2 discography

References

External links
Lyrics

U2 live albums
2005 live albums
Island Records live albums
Self-released albums